Amiga Force was a video games magazine launched towards the end of 1992 by Europress Impact. It lasted for 16 issues before being closed by its publishers. The first issue of Amiga Force went on sale around September 1992. The magazine would switch to monthly release soon after. Amiga Force showed many similarities to other Europress Impact titles, particularly Sega Force. Unlike rival magazine Amiga Power, Amiga Force decided not to include any coverdisks on the issues.

The magazine went through various designs and staff through its lifetime. The March 1994 issue was the last Amiga Force published when Impact Magazines went bust.

References

External links
 Amiga History article on Amiga Force

Amiga magazines
Video game magazines published in the United Kingdom
Defunct computer magazines published in the United Kingdom
Magazines established in 1992
Magazines disestablished in 1994